Saint Kitts and Nevis is an overwhelmingly Christian majority country, with adherents of Islam being a minuscule minority. Due to secular nature of the country's constitution, Muslims are free to proselytize and build places of worship in the country. 

According to a 2009 Pew Research Center report, Muslims constitute approximately 0.1% of the population in Saint Kitts and Nevis. The islands are home to two Islamic centres/mosques and several Islamic organisations. Muslim Student Organisations are also present in the local universities like the Windsor University School of Medicine.

References

Saint Kitts and Nevis
Saint Kitts and Nevis
Religion in Saint Kitts and Nevis